The Digital Museums Canada (DMC; , MNC) is a funding program in Canada "dedicated to online projects by the museum and heritage community," helping organizations to build digital capacity.

Administered by the Canadian Museum of History (CMH) with the financial support of the Government of Canada, DMC provides investments of CA$15,000 to $250,000 for audience-engaging online projects by Canadian museums and heritage organizations.

As of 2021, Digital Museums Canada took the place of the Virtual Museum of Canada (VMC), a national virtual museum. With a directory of over 3,000 Canadian heritage institutions and a database of over 600 virtual exhibits, VMC's site was scheduled to discontinue hosting exhibits after 30 June 2021.

Virtual Museum of Canada 
Virtual Museum of Canada (VMC) was a national virtual museum that was replaced by Digital Museums Canada as of 2021. VMC was administered by the Canadian Museum of History (CMH), and its content was created by Canadian museums.

The VMC included virtual exhibits, educational resources for teachers (in both French and English), and over 900,000 images. With a directory of over 3,000 Canadian heritage institutions and a database of over 600 virtual exhibits, VMC's site was scheduled to discontinue hosting exhibits past 30 June 2021.

Launched by the Department of Canadian Heritage in 2001, VMC was designed as a major collaborative online initiative to allow Canadian museums and heritage organizations to connect with online visitors. In February 2014, the Government of Canada announced its intention to transfer VMC and the Online Works of Reference to CMH. Bill C-31, an Act to implement certain provisions of the budget and other measures, soon after received royal assent confirming that the CMH would assume responsibility for these two programs.

The VMC Investment Programs was created to invest in Canadian museums to create online exhibitions. The Virtual Exhibits Investment Program was geared to medium- to large-sized institutions. The other offerings were the Community Memories Program, an investment program designed for smaller Canadian community museums, to allow them to create online exhibits about their history.

References

External links

  
  

Canada
Museums established in 2001
2001 establishments in Canada
Canadian Museum of History Corporation
Grants (money)
Museum organizations
Funding bodies of Canada